Richard Hewitt (25 May 1943 – 11 October 2017) was an English footballer. He played in the Football League for Barnsley and York City. He won the FA Trophy at Wembley in the 1973 FA Trophy Final, whilst finishing his playing career with Scarborough. He later became a publican in the town.

Hewitt died on 11 October 2017 at age 74.

References

1943 births
2017 deaths
Footballers from West Yorkshire
English footballers
Association football midfielders
Huddersfield Town A.F.C. players
Bradford City A.F.C. players
Barnsley F.C. players
York City F.C. players
Scarborough F.C. players
English Football League players
Sportspeople from Scarborough, North Yorkshire